Simon Laurence John McLeod Hawk (born 22 September 1979) is an English cricketer. Hawk is a right-handed batsman who bowls right-arm medium pace. He was born in Paddington, London.

While studying for his degree at Durham University, Hawk made his first-class debut for Durham UCCE against Durham in 2003. He made a further first-class appearance in 2003, against Lancashire. In his two first-class matches, he scored 81 runs at an average of 20.25, with a high score of 59. This score came against Lancashire.

His great-uncle, Alan McCoy, played first-class cricket in New Zealand for Auckland in the early nineteen thirties.

References

External links
Simon Hawk at ESPNcricinfo
Simon Hawk at CricketArchive

1979 births
Living people
People from Paddington
Alumni of Durham University
English cricketers
Durham MCCU cricketers